SuperStar Search Slovakia is a casting television show based on the popular British show Pop Idol. The show is a contest to determine the best young singer in Slovakia and is shown by the national TV network STV. The second season premiered in November 2005 with castings held in Banská Bystrica, Žilina, Bratislava and Košice.

Regional auditions
Auditions were held in Bratislava, Košice, Banská Bystrica, Žilina in the summer of 2005.

Divadlo
In Divadlo were 100 contestants. The contestants first emerged on stage in groups of 9 or 10 but performed solo unaccompanied, and those who did not impress the judges were cut after the group finished their individual performances. 40 contestants made it to the Semi-final.

Semi-final
The 40 contestants who reached this stage in this season were referred to in the show as the finalists. Below are the four semi-final and one Second Chance semi-final groups with contestants listed in their performance order. In each group, two people advanced to the next round, based on votes by the viewers.

Group 1

Group 2

Group 3

Group 4

Second Chance

Wild Card Round

Finalist

Finals
Eleven contestants made it to the finals. The first single recorded by TOP 11 is called "So mnou môžeš rátať" (You can count on with me) and it was composed by judge Pavol Habera (music) and Slovak poem writer Daniel Hevier. Every final night has its theme. Audience can vote for contestants from the very beginning of the show, voting ends during result show on the same day.

Top 11 – My Idol

Top 10 – Elán

Top 9 – Disco

Top 8 – Big Band

Top 7 – Rock

Top 6 – Duets

Top 5 – Hits of Year 2005

Top 4 – Legends vs Legends

Top 3 – Unplugged

Top 2 – Grand Final

Elimination chart

External links 
 Official Season 2 Site
 Unofficial site

Season 02
2005 Slovak television seasons
2006 Slovak television seasons